Popov is a rural locality (a khutor) and the administrative center of Popovskoye Rural Settlement, Kumylzhensky District, Volgograd Oblast, Russia. The population was 662 as of 2010. There are 14 streets.

Geography 
Popov is located in forest steppe, on Khopyorsko-Buzulukskaya Plain, on the bank of the Yedovlya River, 54 km northwest of Kumylzhenskaya (the district's administrative centre) by road. Olkhovsky is the nearest rural locality.

References 

Rural localities in Kumylzhensky District